TOC1 may refer to:
The TOC protocol, or Talk to OSCAR protocol, a computing protocol
TOC1 (gene), a gene regulating the circadian rhythm in plants